Herpesvirus entry mediator (HVEM), also known as tumor necrosis factor receptor superfamily member 14 (TNFRSF14), is a human cell surface receptor of the TNF-receptor superfamily.

Nomenclature
This protein was originally known as herpesvirus entry mediator A (HveA); HveB and HveC are structurally unrelated proteins of the immunoglobulin superfamily. It is also known as CD270 in the cluster of differentiation classification. Moreover, it is also referred to as ATAR (another TRAF-associated receptor).

Function 

The protein encoded by this gene is a member of the TNF-receptor superfamily. The cytoplasmic region of this receptor was found to bind to several TNF receptor associated factor (TRAF) family members, which may mediate the signal transduction pathways that activate the immune response.

In melanocytic cells TNFRSF14 gene expression may be regulated by MITF.

Interactions 

TNFRSF14 has been shown to interact with TRAF2, TNFSF14 and TRAF5.

Clinical relevance
Mutations in this gene have been recurrently been associated to cases of diffuse large B-cell lymphoma and pediatric-type follicular lymphoma.

This receptor was identified as a cellular mediator of herpes simplex virus (HSV) entry. Binding of HSV viral envelope glycoprotein D (gD) to this receptor protein has been shown to be part of the viral entry mechanism.

References

Further reading 

 
 
 
 
 
 
 
 
 
 
 
 
 
 
 
 

TNF receptor family